The 1974 NBA All-Star Game was played at the Seattle Center Coliseum in Seattle on January 15, 1974.

MVP: Bob Lanier

Coaches: East: Tom Heinsohn, West: Larry Costello.

Eastern Conference

Western Conference

Score by periods
 

Halftime— West, 66-47
Third Quarter— West, 101-85
Officials: Don Murphy and Bob Raskel
Attendance: 14,360.

References

National Basketball Association All-Star Game
All-Star
Basketball competitions in Seattle
NBA All-Star
1970s in Seattle
NBA All-Star Game